This Changes Everything is the first studio album by Cana's Voice. StowTown Records released the album on May 27, 2016.

Critical reception

Awarding the album three and a half stars at New Release Today, Phronsie Howell describes, "This Changes Everything is a strong combination of vocals from powerhouse singers, creating inspirational music that is good for the soul." Kelly Meade, rating the album three and a half stars for Today's Christian Entertainment, writes, "With the release of This Changes Everything, their harmonies blend together with Southern and traditional Gospel music creating a sound that’s all their own." Giving the album four stars by The Christian Beat, Madeleine Dittmer states, "This Changes Everything truly gives glory to God in each song."

Track listing

Charts

References

2016 debut albums